Sevenia benguelae is a butterfly in the family Nymphalidae. It is found in Tanzania (from the western part of the country to the Kigoma district), the Republic of the Congo, the central and western part of the Democratic Republic of the Congo, Angola, western Zambia and Namibia. The habitat consists of savanna woodland.

Adults are attracted to fermenting fruit.

The larvae feed on Maprounea africana.

References

Butterflies described in 1872
benguelae
Butterflies of Africa
Taxa named by Thomas Algernon Chapman